In sports that require a player to play on offense and defense (such as basketball and ice hockey), a two-way player refers to a player who excels at both. In sports where a player typically specializes on offense or defense (like American football), or on pitching or batting (like baseball), it refers to a player who chooses to do both.

Basketball
Commonly used in basketball, a two-way player excels at both the offensive side of the game and the defensive side of the game.

Some of the best two-way players in the National Basketball Association (NBA) have been awarded the NBA Defensive Player of the Year Award.

Michael Jordan, Hakeem Olajuwon, David Robinson, Kevin Garnett, and Giannis Antetokounmpo are the only Defensive Player of the Year winners to have also won the NBA Most Valuable Player Award (MVP) during their careers. Jordan, Olajuwon, and Antetokounmpo won both awards in the same season.

Hockey
In the National Hockey League (NHL), the term two-way forward is used for a forward who handles the defensive aspects of the game as well as the offensive aspects of the game. The best two-way forward is presented with the Frank J. Selke Trophy. The term two-way defenseman is used to describe a defenseman who also makes contributions on offense. Occasionally, a player will be designated as both a defenseman and forward in has career; some recent examples are Nicolas Deslauriers, who was listed as a defenseman in his time in the QMJHL and in his first two professional seasons but as of 2022 is listed as a forward; and Dustin Byfuglien, who began his junior career as a defenseman before being moved up to right wing by the Chicago Blackhawks, then was moved back to defense when he was traded to the Atlanta Thrashers.

Baseball

Background

In Major League Baseball (MLB), there are few true two-way players, as position players generally do not pitch, and most pitchers are poor batters. In the American League especially, the two-way player has mostly ceased to exist, as the designated hitter (DH) rule allows a team to have a designated batter bat in place of the pitcher. Prior to 2021, pitchers in the National League still had to bat for themselves, but they are usually poor batters. In 2017, the average batting average for all of MLB was .255. The average batting average for pitchers was .124, significantly worse than the league average.

Until Shohei Ohtani in 2021, Babe Ruth (in 1918 and 1919) was the last player to pitch 100 innings and have 200 plate appearances as a batter in the same season. (Bullet Rogan achieved the same feat in the Negro Leagues, which was not considered a major league at the time.) Two-way players are still common in college baseball, with the John Olerud Award being given to the best two-way player of the season. However, by the major league level, a player is usually better at either pitching or batting, and rarely is given the chance to do both.

Effective with the 2020 season, "two-way player" became an official MLB roster classification. A player qualifies once he reaches the following statistical milestones in either the current or the immediately previous season:
 At least 20 MLB innings pitched.
 Appearing in at least 20 MLB games as a position player or designated hitter, with at least 3 plate appearances in each of the 20 games.

Once the player qualifies, he retains two-way status for the remainder of the current season plus all of the next season. Two-way players do not count against the limit of 13 pitchers (14 for regular-season games after September 1) on a team's active roster instituted in 2020, and also are not subject to restrictions on pitching by position players that were also introduced in 2020.

For the 2020 season only, statistics from either 2018 or 2019 could be used to qualify a player for two-way status. This allowed the Los Angeles Angels to classify Shohei Ohtani, who did not pitch in 2019 while recovering from Tommy John surgery, as a two-way player in 2020.

Recent players
In 2017, the Tampa Bay Rays selected Brendan McKay, a two-way player, and began developing him as a pitcher and a first baseman; he made his MLB debut as a pitcher and DH during the Rays' 2019 season.

Shohei Ohtani, a two-way player as a pitcher and outfielder, moved from Nippon Professional Baseball to MLB in 2018 and became one of the few players to hit and pitch professionally. He has been used as a DH on days when he does not pitch. Ohtani was named the 2018 American League Rookie of the Year after becoming the first player since Babe Ruth to hit at least 20 home runs and pitch at least 50 innings in the same season. In 2021, Ohtani became the first player to be selected for the MLB All-Star game as both a pitcher and designated hitter, and he finished the year with 46 home runs and a 158 OPS+ as a hitter and a 3.18 ERA on the mound, winning the AL MVP award unanimously.

Los Angeles Angels pitcher Michael Lorenzen, a former two-way player at Cal State Fullerton, amassed 133 at-bats, 31 hits and seven home runs in his seven seasons with the Cincinnati Reds, and he played as an outfielder in 36 games.

Other major-league teams have evaluated prospects as two-way players, including Anthony Gose, Brett Eibner and Trey Ball.

List of notable two-way baseball players

American football
In the National Football League (NFL), there are few two-way players, as most offensive players do not play defense nor do defensive players play offense. A major concern is the possibility of injury when a player is overused. In the early years of the NFL, two-way players were more common as part of the one-platoon system, but in modern times, they are a rarity.

Deion Sanders was a starter on defense who occasionally played offense, except for the 1996 season in which he played a considerable amount of offense as a wide receiver.

Troy Brown, well-regarded for his special-teams skills and as a wide receiver, played significant time at cornerback when starters were injured during the 2004 season. His three interceptions ranked second among Patriots players that season. He also played cornerback in an emergency role during the 2005 and 2006 seasons. 

Patrick Ricard played both as a fullback and a defensive lineman in 2017.

At the college level, some players play on both sides of the ball.. While he was at UCLA, linebacker Myles Jack also played running back, and he won both the Pac-12 Conference Offensive and Defensive Freshman Player of the Year awards.

See also
All-rounder, a cricketer who is skilled at batting and bowling

Notes

References

External links 
 Duncan, Mike. "Shohei Ohtani, The Bambino, and Bullet Joe," The Hardball Times (April 11, 2018).
 Jaffe, Jay. "Shohei Ohtani and Beyond: a History of Double-Duty Players," FanGraphs (April 6, 2018).

Terminology used in multiple sports